Sylvestre is a masculine given name of Latin origin derived from Silva, meaning the forest. Notable people with the name include:

Sylvestre Amoussou (born 1964), Beninese actor and director
Sylvestre Bangui (1934–1996), Central African general, diplomat and politician
Sylvestre Ilunga (born 1947), Congolese politician
Sylvestre Gallot (born 1948), French mathematician
Sylvestre François Lacroix (1765–1843), French mathematician
Sylvestre de Laval (1570–1616), French Catholic theologian
Sylvestre Lopis (born 1947), Senegalese basketball player
Sylvestre Mudacumura (1954–2019), military leader in Rwanda
Sylvestre Mudingayi (1912–unknown), Congolese politician
Sylvestre Nsanzimana (born 1936), Prime Minister of Rwanda from 12 October 1991 to 2 April 1992
Sylvestre Ntibantunganya (born 1956), Burundi politician
Sylvestre Ossiala, Congolese politician
Sylvestre Radegonde, Seychellois diplomat and politician
Sylvestre Ranaivo, Malagasy politician
Sylvestre Ratanga (born c. 1945), Gabonese politician and diplomat
Sylvestre Salumu (born 1996), Belgian rapper known by the stage name Woodie Smalls

See also
Sylvestre (disambiguation)
Saint-Sylvestre (disambiguation)
San Silvestre (disambiguation)

French masculine given names